Electronics Manufacturing Services (EMS) is a term used for companies that design, manufacture, test, distribute, and provide return/repair services for electronic components and assemblies for original equipment manufacturers (OEMs). The concept is also referred to as Electronics Contract Manufacturing (ECM).

Many consumer electronics are built in China, due to maintenance cost, availability of materials, and speed as opposed to other countries such as the United States. Cities such as Shenzhen and Penang have become important production centres for the industry, attracting many consumer electronics companies such as Apple Inc. Some companies such as Flex and Wistron are Original design manufacturers and providers of Electronics manufacturing services.

History
The EMS industry was initially established in 1961 by SCI Systems of Huntsville Alabama.  The industry realized its most significant growth in the 1980s; at the time, most electronics manufacturing for large-scale product runs was handled by the OEMs in-house assembly. These new companies offered flexibility and eased human resources issues for smaller companies doing limited runs. The business model for the EMS industry is to specialize in large economies of scale in manufacturing, raw materials procurement and pooling together resources, industrial design expertise as well as create added value services such as warranty and repairs. This frees up the customer who does not need to manufacture and keep huge inventories of products. Therefore, they can respond to sudden spikes in demand more quickly and efficiently.

The development of Surface Mount Technology (SMT) on printed circuit boards (PCB) allowed for the rapid assembly of electronics. By the mid-1990s the advantages of the EMS concept became compelling and OEMs began outsourcing PCB assembly (PCBA) in large scale. By the end of the 1990s and early 2000s, many OEMs sold their assembly plants to EMSs, aggressively vying for market share. A wave of consolidation followed as the more cash-flush EMS firms were able to buy up quickly both existing plants as well as smaller EMS companies.

Market segments 

The EMS industry is commonly divided into Tiers by their revenue:
Tier 1: >$5 Billion 
Tier 2: $500M to $5B
Tier 3: $100M to $500M
Tier 4: <$100M

There is no hard rule on the actual revenue designation at this time. 
Other categories have been suggested by StepBeyond/EMSinsider and CIRCUITS ASSEMBLY: Micro Tier (<$50M); Tier 4 <10m and "Tier Mega" referring to the Big 2, Foxconn and Flex.

Another distinction is drawn between EMS that specializes in High Mix Low Volume (HMLV) and High Volume Low Mix (HVLM). Mix refers generally to the complexity or different models of the PCB assembly. Volume refers to the number of units built, with products like consumer electronics on the high end and prototype, medical electronics or machinery on the low end. Typically, lower Tier EMS provide HMLV and higher Tier provide HVLM.

During technology's late-1990s heyday, EMS players routinely acquired assets in high-cost locations. EMS players largely focused on printed circuit board fabrication, leaving system assembly to the OEMs. EMS companies largely disdained industries outside the world of information processing (computers) and communications. In recent years, EMS players have shifted production to low-cost geographies; embraced non-traditional industries including consumer electronics, industrial, medical and instrumentation; and added substantial vertical capabilities, stretching from design and ODM through system assembly, test, delivery and logistics, warranty and repair, network services, software and silicon design, and customer service.

EMS has also started to provide design services used in conceptual product development advice and mechanical, electrical and software design assistance. Testing services perform in-circuit, functional, environmental, agency compliance, and analytical laboratory testing. Electronics manufacturing services are located throughout the world and provide numerous benefits. They vary in terms of production capabilities and comply with various quality standards and regulatory requirements.

Notable companies 

Companies engaged in High Volume Low Mix (HVLM) production:
Foxconn
Pegatron
Wistron
SCI Systems
Solectron
Compal Electronics
Quanta Computer
Flextronics
NEOTech
Funai
Hosiden
Orion Electric
Jabil
Inventec
Clevo
Celestica
Dixon Technologies
Sanmina

Companies engaged in Medium Mix Medium Volume (MMMV) production:
 Zollner Electronics
 Enics
 Key Tronic
ESCATEC

Companies engaged in High Mix Medium Volume (HMMV) production:
 Zollner Electronics
 Vexos

E2MS 
E2MS (Electronic Engineering Manufacturing Service) refers to the strategy of integrating product development, prototyping and industrialization services into a traditional EMS business, with the aim to harness potential synergies. A typical E2MS offering will start in the design phase, then continue to support the client in development, prototyping, tooling and production all the way to the testing phase, allowing for faster ramp-up as the product is prepared for mass-production up-front.

The term E2MS was first coined by Escatec and has since been adopted by numerous Tier 2 and Tier 3 producers. Larger companies (Tier 1) have gone even further and offered full concept to mass-production and often taking a stake in the intellectual property, becoming more similar to ODM companies.

References

Production and manufacturing by product